Kapilvastu district, often Kapilbastu, is one of the districts of Lumbini Province, Nepal.

Geography and climate
Geographically, the district can be divided into the low land plains of Terai and the low Chure hills.

Kapilvastu is bounded by Rupandehi District to the east, Dang Deukhuri District in Rapti zone to the northwest, Arghakhanchi District to the north, Balrampur district, Awadh region, Uttar Pradesh, India to the west and Siddharthnagar district, Purvanchal region, Uttar Pradesh to the south.

The summer is hot with temperature above 27 °C and winter temperature remains below 15 °C.
Due to extremely hot and cold climatic conditions, the people suffer from viral fever, dengue, malaria etc. and cold and diarrohea respectively.

Demographics

At the time of the 2011 Nepal census, Kapilvastu District had a population of 571,936. Of these, 49.9% spoke Awadhi, 17.8% Urdu, 17.0% Nepali, 11.3% Tharu, 1.7% Magar, 0.9% Maithili, 0.4% Hindi, 0.2% Bhojpuri, 0.2% Newar, 0.1% Doteli, 0.1% Gurung, 0.1% Kham and 0.1% other languages as their first language.

In terms of ethnicity/caste, 18.2% were Musalman, 12.3% Tharu, 10.2% Yadav, 8.5% Hill Brahmin, 6.3% Kurmi, 4.0% Chhetri, 3.8% Dusadh/Pasawan/Pasi, 3.7% Chamar/Harijan/Ram, 3.5% Magar, 3.1% Kahar, 2.1% Dhobi, 2.1% Kewat, 1.9% Teli, 1.8% Kami, 1.6% Kathabaniyan, 1.3% Kori, 1.3% other Terai, 1.2% Terai Brahmin, 1.1% Badhaee, 1.1% Baraee, 1.1% Hajam/Thakur, 0.9% Kalwar, 0.7% other Dalit, 0.7% Mallaha, 0.7% Sanyasi/Dasnami, 0.6% Damai/Dholi, 0.6% Halwai, 0.6% Lohar, 0.5% Gaderi/Bhedidar, 0.5% Thakuri, 0.4% Lodh, 0.3% Bengali, 0.3% Kayastha, 0.3% Koiri/Kushwaha, 0.3% Marwadi, 0.3% Newar, 0.2% Dhunia, 0.2% Gurung, 0.2% Kumal, 0.2% Sarki, 0.1% Badi, 0.1% Dhandi, 0.1% Dhanuk, 0.1% Kanu, 0.1% Kumhar, 0.1% Majhi, 0.1% Mali, 0.1% Natuwa, 0.1% Pattharkatta/Kushwadiya, 0.1% Sonar, 0.1% Sudhi and 0.1% others.

In terms of religion, 80.6% were Hindu, 18.2% Muslim, 0.9% Buddhist, 0.2% Christian and 0.1% others.

In terms of literacy, 54.7% could read and write, 3.6% could only read and 41.5% could neither read nor write.

Administration
The district consists of ten municipalities, out of which six are urban municipalities and four are rural municipalities. These are as follows:
Kapilvastu Municipality
Banganga Municipality
Buddhabhumi Municipality
Shivaraj Municipality
Krishnanagar Municipality
Maharajgunj Municipality
Mayadevi Rural Municipality
Yashodhara Rural Municipality
Suddhodhan Rural Municipality
Bijaynagar Rural Municipality

Economy
Most of the population of the district is dependent on agriculture. Paddy rice is a major crop of the district. A number of youths rely on foreign employment while sugarcane is an important cash crop.

Population
In 2021 National population and Housing census 2021 was reported that total population of kapilvastu district was	686,739 . 
Male=337,604 and Female=348604 and number of total household was 101,321 
Data source: central bureau of statistics, kathmandu government of Nepal .

Culture
Awadhi people are the major inhabitants of this region, which is very rich in their culture. Awadhi cuisine is well known. Most people of the district follow Sanatana culture and majority of the population is Hindu. Therefore, festivals such as Vijaya Dashami, Deepawali, Holi, Ram Navami and Naag Panchami are very popular. Shivaratri and the month of Shrawana attract huge crowds in the district capital Taulihawa where ancient Tauleshwar Nath Temple exists. Since Kapilvastu was the kingdom of Bhagwan Buddha, Vaishak Purnima is also celebrated in a grand way. The local population including Tharu celebrate Makar Sankranti (Maghi) with festivity. Tharus live in the northern part of the district.

Places of interest

World Marsh Region
A region with biodiversity, cultural, archaeological and historical monuments that has been proposed to be enlisted in the list of World Cultural Heritage of UNESCO.

Archaeological sites
More than 138 historical sites related to Buddha have already been identified within the boundary to the east of Banganga, west of Kothi, north to Indian border and south to Mahendra highway. The forest of the district stands as a natural park. The land is irrigated by the rivers like Banganga, Koili, Surai, Chirai, Bhutera and others.  The latest archaeological excavation carried out under the aegis of the Department of Archaeology (DoA) has discovered that Kapilvastu has the highest number of archaeological sites in the country. The department has identified 136 archaeological sites in the district.

See also
People's Progressive Party
Jagdishpur Lake, Kapilvastu
Bikuli, Kapilvastu
Lumbini Province

References

External links

 

 
Districts of Nepal established in 1962